Les Roquetes is a neighborhood in the Nou Barris district of the city of Barcelona, Catalonia, Spain.

Roquetes metro station, on line L3 of the Barcelona Metro, lies in the neighbourhood.

References

Roquetes
Nou Barris